Tadeusz Polak (born November 17, 1944) is a Polish former footballer who played in the Ekstraklasa, North American Soccer League, and the National Soccer League.

Polak began his career with Wisła Kraków of the Ekstraklasa in 1958. He recorded his first goal for the club on October 14, 1964 against Karpaty Krosno. In total he played in 185 matches, recorded fifteen goals, and won the Polish Cup in 1967. In 1974, he went overseas to Canada to sign with Toronto Metros-Croatia of the North American Soccer League. He featured in the Soccer Bowl '76 against Minnesota Kicks and won the championship by a score of 3-0. In 1979, he signed with the Toronto Falcons of the National Soccer League. He retired with Polonia Hamilton in a local amateur league.

He made two appearances for the Poland national football team. He made his debut on May 7, 1972 in a match against Bulgaria. His final appearance for Poland came in a friendly match on May 10, 1972 against Switzerland.

References 

1944 births
Living people
Polish footballers
Polish expatriate footballers
Poland international footballers
Wisła Kraków players
Toronto Blizzard (1971–1984) players
Toronto Falcons players
Ekstraklasa players
North American Soccer League (1968–1984) players
Canadian National Soccer League players
People from Steyr-Land District
Association football midfielders
Expatriate soccer players in Canada
Polish expatriate sportspeople in Canada